Elbert Aoriul Smith (8 March 1871 – 15 May 1959) was an American leader in the Reorganized Church of Jesus Christ of Latter Day Saints (RLDS Church). He was a member of the church's First Presidency from 1909 to 1938 and the Presiding Patriarch of the church from 1938 to 1958.

RLDS Church leadership
Smith was born in Nauvoo, Illinois, the son of David Hyrum Smith and the grandson of Joseph Smith, Jr., the founder of the Latter Day Saint movement. In 1900, Elbert Smith became a full-time missionary of the RLDS Church.

On 18 April 1909, Smith's uncle Joseph Smith III, who was the president of the RLDS Church, asked him to become one of his counselors in the church's First Presidency. Smith replaced R. C. Evans, who had moved to Canada and been given jurisdiction over the church there.

When Smith's cousin Frederick M. Smith succeeded Joseph Smith III as president of the church, Elbert Smith was retained in the First Presidency as a counselor. Smith moved to Independence, Missouri, after the church made the decision to move its headquarters there from Lamoni, Iowa. Smith remained as a member of the First Presidency until 7 April 1938, when Frederick Smith designated him as the Presiding Patriarch of the church. In 1946, Smith presented a revelation to a World Conference of the church in which he stated that God had selected Israel A. Smith to succeed Frederick Smith, who had recently died.

Smith remained in as Presiding Patriarch of the church until his resignation in 1958 for health reasons, when he was replaced by Roy Cheville.

Author and editor
Smith was a prolific author of books and tracts about the history of the Latter Day Saint movement and the RLDS Church and about church organization and procedure. For many years he was also the editor of Saints' Herald, the official periodical of the RLDS Church. Among Smith's most well-known works is Restoration: A Study in Prophecy and Differences that Persist Between the Reorganized Church of Jesus Christ of Latter Day Saints and the Utah Mormon Church.

Family and death
Smith married Clara Abigail Cochran in Lamoni, Iowa on 4 September 1895. They were the parents of three boys, two of whom survived to adulthood. Smith died at Independence, Missouri, at the age of 88.

Publications
Elbert A. Smith (1908). An Instrument in His Hand (Independence Mo.: Herald House)
—— (1908). The Minister who was Different (Independence Mo.: Herald House)
—— and David H. Smith (1911). Hesperis, or, Poems By Father and Son (Independence Mo.: Herald House)
Elbert A. Smith (1911). The Church in Court (Independence Mo.: Herald House)
—— (1913). A Plea for the Golden Rule (Independence Mo.: Herald House)
—— (1913). Duties of Branch Officers Independence Mo.: Herald House)
—— (1916). Joe Pine Independence Mo.: Herald House)
—— (1920). Corner Stones of the Utah Church (Independence Mo.: Herald House)
—— (1920). Square Blocks and Other Sermons and Articles (Independence Mo.: Herald House)
—— (1922). Timbers for the Temple;: A Story of Old Nauvoo in Days of her Glory (Independence Mo.: Herald House)
—— (1924). The True Philosophy of Church Government (Independence Mo.: Herald House)
—— (1925). In the Beginning God Created: And 3 Other Radio Sermons (Independence, Mo.: RLDS Church)
—— (1927). What Latter Day Saints believe about God (Independence Mo.: Herald House)
—— (1930). Utah Mormon Polygamy. Its Belief and Practice (Independence Mo.: Herald House)
—— (1935). Church Court Procedure: With Suggested Forms to be Used when Preparing and Hearing Cases (Independence Mo.: RLDS Church)
—— (1941). Faith of our Fathers Living Still (Independence Mo.: Herald House)
—— (1941). What Latter Day Saints Believe about Marriage and the Home: With Chapters on the Divorce Problem (Independence Mo.: Herald House)
—— (1943) Differences that Persist Between the Reorganized Church of Jesus Christ of Latter Day Saints and the Utah Mormon Church (Independence Mo.: Herald House) [reprinted by Kessinger Publishing in 2004, ]
—— (1943). Exploring the Church (Independence Mo.: Herald House)
—— (1946). On Memory's Beam: The Autobiography of Elbert A. Smith (Independence Mo.: Herald House) [re-published in a 1959 revised edition as Brother Elbert]
—— (1946). Restoration: A Study in Prohecy (Independence Mo.: Herald House)
—— (1948). Prophetic Warnings in Modern Revelations (Independence Mo.: Herald House)
—— (1950). Evangelists and Patriarchs;: Their Work and Calling (Independence Mo.: Herald House)
—— (1950). Zion Builders' Sermons;: A Series of Doctrinal Sermons Addressed to the Young People of the Church (Independence Mo.: Herald House)
——, F. Henry Edwards and Herbert M. Scott (eds., 1951). Compendium of the Scriptures Including Texts of the Standard Books of the Church (ndependence Mo.: Herald House)
Elbert A. Smith (1951). Blue Pencil Notes (Independence Mo.: Herald House)

Notes

References
Roy Cheville (1970). They Made a Difference (Independence, Mo.: Herald House) pp. 315–326
History of the Reorganized Church of Jesus Christ of Latter Day Saints, vol. 6, pp. 643–647
Roger D. Launius, “Pretender to the Throne? R. C. Evans and the Problem of Presidential Succession in the Reorganization”, Dialogue: A Journal of Mormon Thought vol. 30, no. 2 (Summer 1997) pp. 81–102
"Obituary of Elbert A. Smith", Saints' Herald, vol. 106, no. 26 (1959), p. 608

External links
"The Stewardship of Priesthood" : sermon delivered by Smith on 5 January 1927

1871 births
1959 deaths
American Latter Day Saint missionaries
American Latter Day Saint writers
American leaders of the Community of Christ
Community of Christ missionaries
Doctrine and Covenants people
Editors of Latter Day Saint publications
Latter Day Saint missionaries in the United States
Members of the First Presidency (Community of Christ)
People from Nauvoo, Illinois
Presiding Evangelists of the Community of Christ
Smith family (Latter Day Saints)
Writers from Independence, Missouri